New Washington, officially the Municipality of New Washington (Aklanon: Banwa it New Washington; Hiligaynon: Banwa sang New Washington), is a 3rd class municipality in the province of Aklan, Philippines. According to the 2020 census, it has a population of 47,955 people.

New Washington is particularly known for being the home town of Cardinal Jaime Sin, former Archbishop of Manila.

Etymology
Established on January 15, 1904, the municipality was named after the first president of the United States, George Washington, as a tribute to the Thomasites, a group of American teachers who in the early 1900s established a new public education system in the Philippines, taught basic education, and trained Filipino teachers with English as medium of instruction.

Geography

According to the Philippine Statistics Authority, the municipality has a land area of  constituting  of the  total area of Aklan.

New Washington is bounded by Batan in the east, Kalibo in the west and the Sibuyan Sea on the north.

Climate

The third type of climate predominates in the locality, season not pronounced. It is relatively dry from February to July and wet the rest of the year.

Of note, to deal with water supply along the long peninsula affected by salt water intrusion and related endemic amoebiasis, New Washington was the site of a unique U.S. Peace Corps-sponsored program to build over 200 low-cost circular water wells using locally produced "curved hollow blocks" made locally using custom wooden forms inspired by a local medical doctor and charismatic social activist Andronico "Andrew" Mendoza. Dr. Mendoza organized families to transport individual pre-cast custom hollow blocks to remote areas; the unique design of the locally designed wells obviated the need for expensive and unwieldy steel bar reinforcement. During the early 1980s, each of the 212 water well was dug and constructed throughout this municipality with voluntary community effort ("bayanihan") and are still in use today and exemplifies the spirit of New Washington.

Barangays
New Washington is politically subdivided into 16 barangays.

To some locals, the barangays are grouped into two, namely "Eanas" and "Baybay". The barangays that belong to Eanas are those involved in rice farming such as Mabilo, Puis, Jalas, Guinbaliwan, Mataphao, Candelaria, Lawa-an and Jugas. Baybay, on the other hand, covers barangays along or near the coastline, consisting of Tambac, Poblacion, Pinamuk-an, Polo, Cawayan, Ochando, Fatima and Dumaguit.

Common among municipalities in the Philippines, the seat of local government and the center of business are situated in Poblacion. It is also home to the Municipal Auditorium and Sports Complex, where major events of the town are held.

Demographics

In the 2020 census, New Washington had a population of 47,955.

In the 2007 census, there were 39,656 residents, an increase by 16.7% since the year 2000 when the official count was 33,981. In the 2010 census, the population had increased to 42,112 persons.

Majority of the New Washingtonians, as the municipality's residents are sometimes called, are of Aklanon origin. Immigration, generally, is due to marriage and employment.

New Washingtonians speak in Aklanon, Hiligaynon, Filipino and English, the former being their primary medium. Aklanon, as a language, is often described as a cross between Bisaya, Hiligaynon and Karay-a making it quite complicated for local and foreign tourists to speak and comprehend. This is not seen as a problem, considering that residents can speak fluent Hiligaynon, Tagalog, and English. 

The people of New Washington are predominantly Christians. Religious denominations in the municipality include Roman Catholic Church, Philippine Independent Church, Baptist churches, Iglesia ni Cristo, Seventh-day Adventist Church, Jehovah's Witnesses and the Church of Jesus Christ of Latter-day Saints, among others.

Economy

As New Washington is surrounded by bodies of water such as Sibuyan Sea and Lagatik River. Fishing has been the leading livelihood among the people, alongside rice farming. The town has the largest area of ricefields among the municipalities in Aklan.

The municipality operates two ports: one in Dumaguit and the other in Poblacion. The port in Dumaguit caters to passenger and commercial boats, while the port in Poblacion is only for the latter. Both ports serve as major trade routes between the province of Aklan and Manila.

The town has several edifices that have historical or spiritual significance and locations for leisure and relaxation. These include the NHI-recognized commemorative monument of its native son His Eminence Jaime Cardinal Lachica Sin and the Diocesan Shrine of Our Lady of the Most Holy Rosary in Poblacion, the Pink Sisters' Immaculata Adoration Convent in Polo, the Sunrise/Sunset Viewing at Tambak Seawall and the Sampaguita Gardens Resort in Poblacion.

Education
All the barangays have either an elementary or primary school. There are four secondary schools: New Washington National Comprehensive High School and Montfort Technical Institute (MTI) in Poblacion, Candelaria National High School in Candelaria and Ochando National High School in Ochando. Montessori de Aklan (MDA),a primary school,is a branch of Montessori de Zamboanga Schools which is an affiliate of AMS or American Montessori Society in Polo, Tertiary education is centered at Aklan State University - College of Fisheries and Marine Sciences, which is located in Poblacion. Vocational courses are also offered at MTI. Some families send their children to schools in Kalibo, Capiz, Iloilo and Manila, among others.

Cultural and historical significance

New Washington observes two annual fiestas as a town. One is a patronal fiesta in honor of Our Lady of the Most Holy Rosary, which is held on the second Saturday of October and the other is a civic fiesta commemorating the heroes of Pacto de Sangre, which is held from March 1 to 3. The Pacto de Sangre, or blood compact, took place in the then Sitio Kuntang (now Barangay Ochando) on March 3, 1897. It was participated in by New Washingtonians of the past as a show of support to the Filipinos' revolution against the Spaniards. A commemorative marker was put up in the area where the event took place in Barangay Ochando. While the patronal fiesta is characterized by pious reflection, the civic fiesta involves three days of merry-making.

Tourism
The municipality has numerous beach resorts located near the shores from Mabilo to Dumaguit. The past decade saw an influx of inland resorts. The inland resorts in the town are mostly in Poblacion, some of which include Sampaguita Gardens Resort, Maria Mercedes Resort and Frogs Hollow Resort. For free means of leisure and entertainment, residents go to the town plaza, which houses the Jaime Cardinal L. Sin Park, the Rizal Park, the Municipal Children's Park and the Municipal Auditorium and Sports Complex.

Well-known restaurants in the town include Oriental Flavors (fine-dining) and Poolside Restaurant at Sampaguita Gardens, and the Residence River Restaurant (Seafoods) in Tambak.

References

External links

 [ Philippine Standard Geographic Code]

Municipalities of Aklan